André Gregory Bona (born 19 January 1990) is a French professional footballer who plays as a defender.

Club career

Early career
Bona began playing football at age five with local club Afro–Antillais before switching to S.O. Caillolais. At age thirteen, he joined the academy of Ligue 1 side Olympique de Marseille but ultimately left to focus on sprinting. After six years competing at the national level in the 60m, 100m and 200m, Bona returned to football at the senior amateur level. In 2014, he received offers from clubs in the Championnat National 2 and Championnat National 3, but opted to pursue an education overseas in Canada instead.

From 2014 to 2018 Bona attended the Université du Québec à Montréal, where he studied environmental science. In 2017, he signed with local PLSQ side CS Longueuil and made nine league appearances that season. The following year, he made another twelve league appearances for Longueuil, scoring three goals.

HFX Wanderers
On 12 November 2018, Bona was selected in the second round of the CPL–U Sports Draft, 10th overall, by the HFX Wanderers. On 29 March 2019, Bona officially signed with Wanderers and made his Canadian Premier League debut on 28 April 2019 as a substitute in the club's inaugural match.

André Bona scored his first goal for Halifax in the round Two in the Canadian Championship in Winnipeg against Valour FC on June 12, 2019. During injury time the defender countered  Valour FC off a corner and demonstrated his pace by sprinting  and scoring  on an open net, sealing  a 2-0 win at Investors Group Field stadium. On 14 December 2019, the club announced that Bona would not return for the 2020 season.

References

External links

1990 births
Living people
Association football defenders
French footballers
Footballers from Marseille
Black French sportspeople
French expatriate footballers
Expatriate soccer players in Canada
French expatriate sportspeople in Canada
Université du Québec à Montréal alumni
HFX Wanderers FC draft picks
HFX Wanderers FC players
Première ligue de soccer du Québec players
Canadian Premier League players
University and college soccer players in Canada
CS Longueuil players